SDD may refer to:

Computing 
 Software Design Description (IEEE 1016–2009), a standard that specifies the form of the document used to specify system architecture and application design in a software-related project
 Software Design Document, a written outline of the development of a course or a description of a software product

 Solution Deployment Descriptor, a proposed OASIS standard for software deployment, configuration and maintenance
 Software Design and Development, an HSC subject in NSW that details the basics of designing and developing software applications
 Syntax-Directed Definition - a context-free grammar with attributes and rules

Finances 
 SDD, for SEPA Direct Debit, a payment system in the Single Euro Payments Area in Europe
 SDD, ISO code for the Sudanese dinar, the currency of Sudan 1992–2007, now replaced by the Sudanese pound

Science
 Sulfadimidine, an antibiotic whose abbreviations include SDD
 Silicon drift detector, a p-n junction-based detector for ionizing radiation, such as for X-rays
 Seasonal deficit disorder, another name for seasonal affective disorder
 Symmetric diagonally dominant matrix systems in mathematics
 Selective decontamination of the digestive tract in medicine